Lydina is a genus of flies in the family Tachinidae.

Species
These seven species belong to the genus Lydina:
 Lydina aenea (Meigen, 1824) c g
 Lydina americana (Townsend, 1892) i c g b
 Lydina areos (Walker, 1849) i c g
 Lydina cuprea Robineau-Desvoidy, 1830 c g
 Lydina immista Reinhard, 1955 c g
 Lydina polidoides (Townsend, 1892) c g
 Lydina ussuricola Richter, 1993 c g
Data sources: i = ITIS, c = Catalogue of Life, g = GBIF, b = Bugguide.net

References

Tachininae
Diptera of Europe
Tachinidae genera
Taxa named by Jean-Baptiste Robineau-Desvoidy